The Last Airbender is a video game based on the film of the same name for the Wii and Nintendo DS. It was released on June 29, 2010 in North America, in Europe on August 6, 2010, and in Australia on September 9, 2010. Like the previous Avatar: The Last Airbender games, it was developed by THQ Studio Australia and published by THQ. It received mixed reviews, with many critics calling it an improvement over the movie.

Gameplay
Players get to play as Aang, Prince Zuko, and the Blue Spirit (an alter-ego of Zuko). Players play as Aang who uses airbending, play as Prince Zuko who uses firebending, and play as the Blue Spirit who uses stealth moves and sword attacks.

Story

Reception 

The game received mixed reviews. Video game talk show Good Game's presenters gave the Wii version a score of 4.5 and 4 out of 10. They criticized the absence of being able to block attacks, believing such a feature would've been easy to include. They also pointed out that the levels felt repetitive. The Avatar State was also perceived as annoying due to requiring players to repeat the sequence every time a mistake was made. The character's controls were also criticized for being too sensitive which led to unfair deaths. The Blue Spirit was specifically criticized for his difficulty to turn around when in stealth mode. While the co-op arena mode was enjoyed by Good Game due to its simplicity, they felt disappointed with the lack of co-op in story mode.

Reviews for the game were generally much more positive than those of the film.

References

External links 
 
 

2010 video games
Action video games
Avatar: The Last Airbender games
Nintendo DS games
THQ games
Video games based on films
Video games developed in Australia
Video games scored by Mick Gordon
Wii games
Halfbrick Studios games
Multiplayer and single-player video games
Cooperative video games